On 27 August 2015, the bodies of 71 illegal immigrants were discovered in a lorry on the Ost Autobahn in Burgenland, Austria. The victims were part of the wave of many thousands of migrants who traveled through the western Balkans in an effort to reach Germany. The borders were opened shortly afterward to allow the influx across.

Vehicle 
The lorry, a Volvo FL 180, involved in the incident belonged to the Hungarian firm of Mastermobiliker Ltd, which had been under bankruptcy proceedings since July 2014. The lorry also bore the logo of a Slovak livestock company, Hyza, where it had previously been owned. The lorry was registered with Hungarian number plates, which officials stated had been registered by a Romanian citizen.

The truck – two-axle, with a refrigerated box body and a total mass of 7.5 t hz – was parked in an emergency bay on the A4 east autobahn between Neusiedl am See and Parndorf, about one kilometer after the Neusiedl exit in the direction of Vienna. A witness stated that he had already seen the vehicle in the emergency bay at around 9:45 a.m. on the morning of August 26. A man fled from there by car.

On the morning of August 27, 2015, the truck was discovered by an employee of the state road construction company ASFINAG while mowing, who then alerted the police. The cab was unlocked and empty.

Incident 
The lorry had set off from Budapest and continued from Röszke early on Wednesday 25 August, and had reached the Hungary-Austrian border by 09:00. It then crossed into Austria during the night, and was spotted by police at 05:00  or 06:00 on Thursday morning. During the first 80 minutes of the journey, the driver had heard the victims calling for help. The vehicle was discovered between Neusiedl and Parndorf after the drivers had abandoned the vehicle. During grass mowing, blood and other fluids were noticed dripping from the doors along with a stench; officers opened the back of the vehicle at 11:40 on the Thursday.  

The back door of the lorry was not locked but had been securely closed with wires, and the refrigeration system had showed no signs of being switched on, and there were no vents to allow fresh air to the victims. There were no survivors.

Victims 
A total of 59 men, eight women, and four children perished, of which 29 were from Iraq, 21 from Afghanistan, 15 from Syria and the other six not known. Death was by suffocation. All but 13 of the bodies were returned to their families; the remainder were buried in Liesing, Vienna at a Muslim cemetery.

Due to the high level of decomposition of the bodies due to high heat, identification was done with forensic help, and investigating mobile phones and contents of bags found among the corpses. Others were identified after concerned family members who had lost contact with loved ones, reached out to authorities, and provided genetic samples for testing.

Investigation and litigation 
Initially Hungarian police told reporters that they had arrested four men; three Bulgarians and an Afghan citizen and questioned over 20 people. Of those arrested one was believed to be the owner of the lorry, and two others drove the lorry.

The group of smugglers responsible for the deaths were prosecuted in a Hungarian court in 2018 with four found guilty of homicide and sentenced to 25 years in prison. Another ten were convicted on charges of belonging to a criminal smuggling organisation and were all given sentences ranging from three to twelve years.

Response 
German Chancellor Angela Merkel spoke to journalists about the incident while in Vienna, where she was taking part in the Western Balkan Nations on Europe's Refugee Crisis summit, to discuss topics such as the refugee crisis. Merkel stated that she was shaken by the news and the incident was a warning for leaders to tackle the issue of migration quickly. 

Austrian Foreign Minister Johanna Mikl-Leitner and Austrian Chancellor Werner Faymann also spoke out about the incident, stating that human smugglers are criminals and that the refugees had attempted to escape but were killed at the hands of the smugglers.

Amnesty International spoke out against the events and called on European leaders and citizens to show solidarity to refugees.

See also
2000 Dover incident
2022 San Antonio trailer deaths
Essex lorry deaths
Mozambique people smuggling disaster
Ranong human-smuggling incident
List of migrant vehicle incidents in Europe

References

 
2015 crimes in Austria
2015 in international relations
2015 road incidents in Europe
2010s trials
August 2015 crimes in Europe
Corpses discovery
Man-made disasters in Austria
Migrant disasters in Europe
Road incidents in Austria
Trials in Austria
2015 disasters in Austria